Adeso (previously Horn Relief) is Nairobi-based humanitarian non-governmental organization.

The organisation was founded by Fatima Jibrell in 1991, who handed leadership over to her daughter Degal Ali in 2006.

The organisation is noted for its use of cash-based programming to support communities in Somalia and Kenya and for its executive director's advocacy efforts around advancing localisation. Its programs in Somalia, Kenya, and South Sudan also include women's literacy, agricultural support, and community environmental education.

Nomenclature and history 
Adeso is a portmanteau of Africa Development Solutions.
Adeso was founded in Connecticut, in 1991 by environmental activist Fatima Jibrell. Adeso was initially known as Horn of Africa Relief and Development Organization, with a mandate to provide a response to humanitarian needs in Somalia in the context of the Somali civil war and its effects on Jibrell's homeland of Somalia. Initial activities included the protection of acacia trees and old growth forest against logging for charcoal.

In 1998, the organization changed its name to Horn Relief.

In 2002, in response to Jibrell's advocacy work, the Puntland Government banned the export of charcoal in the region. The same year, Jibrell won the international Goldman Environmental Prize for Africa.

The organisation implemented the first large-scale cash transfer program in Somalia in 2003.

In 2006, Jibrell retired as executive director, and was succeeded by her daughter Degan Ali. The following year, Jibrell won the National Geographic's Buffett Award for Leadership in African Conservation, and the organisation published a cash transfer implementation manual. Also in 2006, the organisation launched a women's literary program in Sanaag, Somaliland. The program was initially met with some resistance from people who objected to women's education on religious grounds, however staff demonstrated that Koranic verses supported the education of women.

The organisation changed its name to Adeso in 2012.  Somali-American actor Barkhad Abdi joined Adeso as a voluntary Goodwill Ambassador in 2014.

In 2019, Adeso pushed for a shift of power towards locally-community run humanitarian organisations. Adeso was one of the 286 organisations chosen by MacKenzie Scott to receive a share of her US$2.7 billion unrestricted donation in 2021.

Activities 

A significant part of Adeso's work is the delivery of cash assistance, which is often provided to pastoralists. Cash is used by people to pay off debt, and meeting their basic education and healthcare needs. Adeso adopts a "Inclusive Community-Based Targeting" approach to its activities, adjusting to local cultural and religious norms, respecting the traditional community hierarchy and role of elders and communities leaders who form Village Relief Committees. The committees are obliged to consist of at least 40% women. The committee meets in a public space (in what is known locally as a kulan) and discusses the needs of each potential program beneficiary and then does house-to-house verification of unmet humanitarian needs. This process improves local community ownership of the program and means that the needs assessment, while slower than traditional humanitarian aid, is done by people with the best local knowledge.

Other program activities include women's literacy, cash-for-work programs, and agriculture programs that provide seeds and tools to pastoralists Adeso's community education about environment covers the impacts of charcoal use small scale irrigation.

Advocacy efforts cover topics such as illegal overfishing in Somali waters and the importance of allowing cash remittances into Somalia.

Activities are centred around the Sool and Sanaag regions of Somali and extend also into Kenya and South Sudan.

Organization 

Adeso has its headquarters in Nairobi, Kenya, and is registered as a charity in the United Kingdom, Kenya, and the United States. There are approximately 45 staff in the Nairobi head office and nearly 250 staff in field offices. The 2012 revenues for Adeso were $25 million.

See also 

 Network for Empowered Aid Response

References

External links 
 

Development charities based in Kenya
Organisations based in Nairobi
1991 establishments in Connecticut
Humanitarian aid organizations
Organizations established in 1991
Non-governmental organizations